The AACTA Award for Best Lead Actor in a Television Drama is an accolade given by the Australian Academy of Cinema and Television Arts (AACTA), a non-profit organisation whose aim is to "identify, award, promote and celebrate Australia's greatest achievements in film and television." The award is handed out at the annual AACTA Awards, which rewards achievements in Australian feature film, television, documentaries and short films. From 1986 to 2010, the category was presented by the Australian Film Institute (AFI), the Academy's parent organisation, at the annual Australian Film Institute Awards (known as the AFI Awards). When the AFI launched the Academy in 2011, it changed the annual ceremony to the AACTA Awards, with the current prize being a continuum of the AFI Award for Best Lead Actor in a Television Drama.

The award was first presented in 1986, as two separate categories for performances in a miniseries and tele feature. These were then merged in 1990 to become Best Actor in a Leading Role in a Telefeature or Mini Series, and by 1991, the award was renamed Best Actor in a Leading Role in a Television Drama. In 2000, the Best Performance in a Telefeature or Mini Series accolade was re-introduced as a separate prize from the drama award. All of these were then combined in 2002, under the title Best Actor in a Leading Role in a Television Drama, and two years later, in 2004, was renamed Best Actor in a Leading Role in a Television Drama or Comedy. A separate comedy award was established in 2006, and the name reverted to Best Lead Actor in a Television Drama.

The AACTA Award for Best Lead Actor in a Television Drama is given for performances in television drama series, miniseries, telefeature, children's animation or children's drama series. Candidates for this award must be human and male, and cannot be nominated for best guest or supporting actor in a television drama in the same year, for the same production.

Winners and nominees
In the following table, the years listed correspond to the year that the television programme aired on Australian television; the ceremonies are usually held the following year. The actor whose name is emphasised in boldface and highlighted in yellow have won the award. Those that are neither highlighted nor in bold are the nominees. When sorted chronologically, the table always lists the winning actor first and then the other nominees. There was no nomination announcement for television categories leading up to the 1986 awards, and therefore only the winners are known.

All sources used in this article make no mention of the episode or series that the actor was nominated for prior to 1991, and therefore have "N/A" template in the "Episode/Series" column. After 1991, the winners and nominees with the "N/A" template in the "Episode/Series" column are television films or miniseries. Those winners and nominees which have the "N/A" template and crosses (†) in the "Episode/Series" column, are TV series, but all reliable sources do not indicate which episode or series the actor was nominated for.

Best Performance by an Actor in a Leading Role in a Mini Series (1986–1989)

Best Performance by an Actor in a Leading Role in a Telefeature (1986–1989)

Best Performance by an Actor in a Leading Role, in a Mini-Series or Telefeature (1990)

Best Actor in a Leading Role in a Television Drama (1991–2002)

Best Performance by an Actor in a Telefeature or Mini Series (2000–2001)

Best Actor in a Leading Role in a Television Drama or Comedy (2003–2004)

Best Lead Actor in Television (2005)

Best Lead Actor in a Television Drama (2006–current)

See also
 AACTA Award for Best Guest or Supporting Actor in a Television Drama
 AACTA Awards

Notes

A: From 1958–2010, the awards were held during the year of the films release. However, the 1974–75 awards was held in 1975 for films released in 1974 and 1975, and the first AACTA Awards was held in 2012 for films released in 2011.
B: All sources used in this article do not mention the name of John Hargreaves' character in The Lizard King.
C: The official AACTA website lists Corey McKernan's nomination in 2010 for The Legend of Enyo. However, there are no sources which indicates McKernan's involvement with the aforementioned series, and the original nominations list from the AFI website has him short listed for his performance in Lockie Leonard.

References

A
AACTA Awards